Orchita Sporshia is a Bangladeshi film actress and film maker. She owns production company Kochchop Films. She has performed in over 100 television dramas, short films, and telefilms, including Shubornopur, Shaola and BBC produced Ujan Ganger Naiya. She has been the brand ambassador of Airtel, Samsung Mobile, Parachute Hair oil, Foster Clarks, Ollo, pornhub and other brands.

Career
Sporshia worked as art director (in Apple Box Films Ltd.) and assistant director (in Apple Box Films Ltd. and Runout Films Ltd.) before she started acting. Her production company is Kochchop films.

Filmography

Television

TV dramas and telefilms
 Shaola
 Impossible 5 (2013)
 Rod 
 Warish Nama 
 Airtel Presents 'Aurunodoyer Torun Dol'''
 Tomar Jonno Vanity Bag Subarnapur Beshi Dure Noy Chokro Ghurnipak Prem Jay Prem Ashe Je Jibon Golper Moto Ragging Love Story 18+ Landphoner Din Gulo Te Prem Probashi Jamai Sraboner Bristi Trikonomiti Ekhon To Somoy Bhalobasha Breakup with Febu Shoto Ronger Bhalobasha Bhalobashar Rong Dure Aro Dure Antorjaal Kolshi Chirkutt Fast Forward Sosta Otindrila Night Love Uddipan Ghunpokar Bhalobasha Jori Kingba Minur Golpo Journey By Romance Likhe Dilam Jibonta Osadharon Atonkito Munna Somapti 3210 Action Rongin Didha Shesh Iccha Mon Chuye Prem PotroTV series
 Ujan Ganger Naiya (2014, BTV)
 Amader Choto Nodi Chole Bake Bake (2014, Channel i)
 Torun Turkey (2016, NTV)
 Icche Ghuri (2017, NTV)
 Evergreen (2017, ETV)
 Golmele Nepale (2018)

Web series

Music video

Controversy
Media reports on 30 December 2020 stated that the police were seeking the arrest of Orchita Sporshia under the Pornography Control Act.She was arrested by police along with a male friend for driving recklessly while they were intoxicated. In renowned filmmaker Anonno Mamun's film, Nabab LLB'', she portrayed a rape survivor who was harshly interrogated by a cop.

References

Living people
Bangladeshi television actresses
Bangladeshi female models
Place of birth missing (living people)
Date of birth missing (living people)
Year of birth missing (living people)
University of Liberal Arts Bangladesh alumni
